Cyrtopodion kirmanense, also known as the Kirman thin-toed gecko or  the Kerman bent-toed gecko, is a species of gecko, a lizard in the family Gekkonidae. The species is endemic to eastern Iran.

Geographic range
C. kirmanense is found in Kerman Province, Iran.

References

Further reading
Nikolsky AM (1900). "Reptiles, amphibies [sic] et poissons, recueillis pendant le voyage de Mr. N. A Zaroudny en 1898 dans la Perse ". Annuaire du Musée Zoologique de l'Académie Impériale des Sciences de St. Pétersbourg 24 (4): 376-417 + Plate XX. (Gymnodactylus kirmanensis, new species, pp. 381-383). (Text in Russian, diagnoses and localities in Latin, title in French and Russian).

Cyrtopodion
Reptiles described in 1900
Taxa named by Alexander Nikolsky